The following outline is provided as an overview of and topical guide to Mizoram:

Mizoram – one of the states of Northeast India, with Aizawl as its capital city. The name is derived from Mi (people), Zo (Belonging to the people of Mizoram/Lushai Hills) and Ram (land), and thus Mizoram implies "land of the hill people". In the northeast, it is the southernmost landlocked state sharing borders with three of the Seven Sister States, namely Tripura, Assam, Manipur.

General reference

Names 
 Common English name: Mizoram
 Pronunciation: 
 Official English name(s): Mizoram
 Nickname(s): 
 Adjectival(s): Mizo
 Demonym(s): Mizos

Rankings (amongst India's states) 

 by population: 28th
 by area (2011 census): 25th 
 by crime rate (2015): 13th
 by gross domestic product (GDP) (2014): 28th
by Human Development Index (HDI): 
by life expectancy at birth: 
by literacy rate: 2nd

Geography of Mizoram 

Geography of Mizoram
 Mizoram is: an Indian state, and one of the Seven Sister States
 Population of Mizoram: 1,091,014 (2011)
 Area of Mizoram: 21,087 km2 (8,142 sq mi)
 Atlas of Mizoram

Location of Mizoram 
 Mizoram is situated within the following regions:
 Northern Hemisphere
 Eastern Hemisphere
 Eurasia
 Asia
 South Asia
 India
 Northeastern India
 Seven Sister States
 Time zone:  Indian Standard Time (UTC+05:30)

Environment of Mizoram

Natural geographic features of Mizoram 

 Highest point: Phawngpui

Protected areas of Mizoram 

 Murlen National Park
 Phawngpui National Park
 Dampa Tiger Reserve

Regions of Mizoram

Ecoregions of Mizoram

Administrative divisions of Mizoram

Districts of Mizoram 

Districts of Mizoram
 Aizawl district
 Champhai district
 Kolasib district
 Lawngtlai district
 Lunglei district
 Mamit district
 Saiha district
 Serchhip district

Municipalities of Mizoram 

 Cities of Mizoram
 Capital of Mizoram: Aizawl
 Bairabi
 Biate
 Champhai
 Darlawn
 Hnahthial
 Kolasib
 Khawhai
 Khawzawl
 Lawngtlai
 Lengpui
 Lunglei
 Mamit
 North Kawnpui
 North Vanlaiphai
 Saiha
 Sairang
 Saitual
 Serchhip
 Thenzawl
 Tlabung
 Vairengte
 Zawlnuam

Demography of Mizoram 

Demographics of Mizoram

Government and politics of Mizoram 

Politics of Mizoram

 Form of government: Indian state government (parliamentary system of representative democracy)
 Capital of Mizoram: Aizawl
 Elections in Mizoram
 Assembly election results of Mizoram

Union government in Mizoram 
 Rajya Sabha members from Mizoram
 Mizoram Pradesh Congress Committee
 Indian general election, 2009 (Mizoram)

Branches of the government of Mizoram 

Government of Mizoram

Executive branch of the government of Mizoram 

 Head of state: Governor of Mizoram, 
 Raj Bhavan – official residence of the Governor
 Head of government: Chief Minister of Mizoram,

Legislative branch of the government of Mizoram 

Mizoram Legislative Assembly
 Assembly election results of Mizoram

Judicial branch of the government of Mizoram 

 Gauhati High Court

Law and order in Mizoram 

 Law enforcement in Mizoram
 Mizoram Police

History of Mizoram 

History of Mizoram

History of Mizoram, by period

Prehistoric Mizoram

Ancient Mizoram

Medieval Mizoram

Colonial Mizoram

Contemporary Mizoram

History of Mizoram, by region

History of Mizoram, by district 

 History of Lawngtlai district
 History of Saiha district

History of Mizoram, by municipality 

 History of Champhai
 History of Lawngtlai
 History of Lunglei
 History of Saitual
 History of Serchhip
 History of Thenzawl
 History of Tlabung
 History of Zawlnuam

History of Mizoram, by subject

Culture of Mizoram 

Culture of Mizoram
 Architecture of Mizoram
 Languages in Mizoram
 Mizo language
 Monuments in Mizoram
 Monuments of National Importance in Mizoram
 State Protected Monuments in Mizoram
 World Heritage Sites in Mizoram

Art in Mizoram 

 Literature of Mizoram
 Mizo literature
 Music of Mizoram

People of Mizoram 

 Mizo people

Religion in Mizoram 

Religion in Mizoram
 Christianity in Mizoram

Sports in Mizoram 

Sports in Mizoram
 Cricket in Mizoram
 Mizoram cricket team
 Cricket Association of Mizoram
 Football in Mizoram
 Mizoram Football Association
 Mizoram football team
 Mizoram Premier League

Symbols of Mizoram 

Symbols of Mizoram
 State animal: Serow
 State bird: Hume's pheasant
 State flower: Vanda
 State seal: Seal of Mizoram
 State tree: Mesua ferrea

Economy and infrastructure of Mizoram 

Economy of Mizoram
 Tourism in Mizoram
 Transport in Mizoram
 Lengpui Airport
 Kaladan Multi-modal Transit Transport Project
 Bairabi Sairang Railway
 State highways in Mizoram
 Water supply and sanitation in Mizoram
 Tuirial Dam
 Serlui B Dam

Education in Mizoram 

Education in Mizoram
 Institutions of higher education in Mizoram
 Mizoram University
 National Institute of Technology Mizoram

Health in Mizoram 

Health in Mizoram

See also 

 Outline of India
 Reiek
 Vantawng Falls
 Palak Dil
 Hmuifang
 Solomon's Temple, Aizawl
 Tam Dil

References

External links 

 Official government website

Mizoram
Mizoram